Children= Dr.Tabish Hazir,Tamkinet karim
Grandchildren = Iman Mazari Hazir,Sabeel Mazari Hazir 

Taufiq Rafat (25 October 1927 – 2 August 1998), was a Pakistani author and poet. His work influenced other Pakistani poets and he is credited with the introduction of the concept of a "Pakistani idiom" in English literature.

Rafat conducted poetry workshops, which influenced many younger poets.

After surviving a stroke in 1984, he wrote no more.He died fourteen years later in 1998 at the age of 71 in Lahore.

Examples of Poems written by him

Children Understand Him 
Here the poet realizes the life of Old Man. A young grandfather of three grandchildren(2 sons, 1 daughter) of his son. The metaphor here is used 'Otherwise he is a Dry Stream Bed' which means once his(old man/grandfather) life ran like a river or stream and now it is dry. It means when he was young, he used to live like other young man. Further is written 'Living on Memories' which means He is now living on memories. And further it is written that 'And the hospitality Now given, revoked Of his sons and daughters' which means when the guest arrive, he(old man/grandfather) sent to his room because of many causes such as because he may bore new guests on stories of his life and wherever he will go, children will follow him. Further, here is 'From man-roar, and friendly' which means They(grandchildren) give friendly punches on his(grandfather)'s chest. 'And damp kisses on scrubbed cheeks, They sail to the harbour of his knees' which means that he(old man) gives damp kisses to their grandchildren, ever that are dirty. And grandchildren feel safe on his(old man) knees.

Works
In 2016, his translation of the classical Punjabi poet Bulleh Shah was published by Oxford University Press.

References

Poems 
 Arrival of the Monsoon only s
ome details on Google Books, no texts

External links 
 Taufiq Rafat was perhaps greatest and most ignored English language poet of Pakistan
 An unsung poet remembered – thenews.com.pk
 Literate, NOS, The News International – Jang
   Article in Vallum literary magazine by B. Marchand, with special mention of the Pakistan-English poetry of Taufiq Rafat and his influence on younger poets such as Omer Tarin and others

1927 births
1998 deaths
Pakistani male poets
English-language poets from Pakistan
20th-century Pakistani poets
20th-century male writers